Welcome Home is the second studio album by the American band 'Til Tuesday, released in 1986. It peaked at No. 49 on the Billboard 200.

Track listing
"What About Love" (Mann) – 3:56
"Coming Up Close" (Mann) – 4:40
"On Sunday" (Hausman, Holmes, Mann, Pesce) – 4:06
"Will She Just Fall Down" (Mann) – 2:49
"David Denies" (Hausman, Holmes, Mann, Pesce) – 4:50
"Lovers' Day" (Mann, Pesce) – 4:19
"Have Mercy" (Mann) – 4:55
"Sleeping and Waking" (Hausman, Holmes, Mann, Pesce) – 3:24
"Angels Never Call" (Mann) – 3:40
"No One Is Watching You Now" (Mann) – 3:52

Personnel
'Til Tuesday
Aimee Mann – vocals and bass
Joey Pesce – piano, synthesizers, backing vocals
Robert Holmes – guitars, backing vocals
Michael Hausman – drums and percussion
Technical
Mark McKenna, Rhett Davies - engineer
Bruce Lampcov - engineer, mixing
Mark Larson - art direction
Erica Lennard - photography

Charts

Certifications

References

'Til Tuesday albums
1986 albums
Albums produced by Rhett Davies
Epic Records albums